Henry Northcote may refer to:

 Sir Henry Northcote, 4th Baronet (1655–1730), English doctor
 Sir Henry Northcote, 5th Baronet (1710–1743), Member of Parliament for Exeter 1730–1743
 Henry Northcote, 1st Baron Northcote (1846–1911), Governor-General of Australia and Governor of Bombay
 Henry Northcote, 3rd Earl of Iddesleigh (1901–1970), see Earl of Iddesleigh

See also
Northcote (disambiguation)